Phoenix Iron Works may refer to:

Australia
 Phoenix Iron Works, now Tulloch Limited, Rhodes, New South Wales

United States
Phoenix Iron Works (Phoenixville, Pennsylvania) (1855–1984)
Phoenix Iron Works (Oakland, California) (founded in 1901)
Phoenix Iron Works of Hartford, renamed Taylor & Fenn in 1930, Connecticut, United States; see Stackpole, Moore, and Tryon Building
 Phoenix Iron Works, Richmond, Virginia, United States; see Richmond, Virginia
 Phoenix Iron Works (Savannah, Georgia) (founded in 1873)

United Kingdom
 Phoenix Works, Glasgow, Scotland; see Thomas Edington
 Phoenix Iron Works, Phoenix Iron Works parish, Gloucestershire, England

Ireland
 Royal Phoenix Iron Works, Dublin, Ireland; see Seán Heuston Bridge

See also
Phenix Works, a steel working factory located in Flémalle-Haute, Liege, Belgium